MAP kinase-activating death domain protein is an enzyme that in humans is encoded by the MADD gene.

Tumor necrosis factor alpha (TNF-alpha) is a signaling molecule that interacts with one of two receptors on cells targeted for apoptosis. The apoptotic signal is transduced inside these cells by cytoplasmic adaptor proteins. The protein encoded by this gene is a death domain-containing adaptor protein that interacts with the death domain of TNF-alpha receptor 1 to activate mitogen-activated protein kinase (MAPK) and propagate the apoptotic signal. It is membrane-bound and expressed at a higher level in neoplastic cells than in normal cells. Several transcript variants encoding different isoforms have been described for this gene.

References

Further reading